Chacharramendi is a village and rural locality (municipality) in the department of Utracán in La Pampa Province in Argentina.

References

Populated places in La Pampa Province